The African angelshark (Squatina africana) is an angelshark of the family Squatinidae.

Measurements
Born: 28–30 cm TL; Mature: ~ 80 cm (M), 90 cm (F) TL; Max: ~ 122 cm TL.

Identification
Color: Are a greyish or a reddish-brown, there are many light and dark spots, which are often large granular-centered ocelli in young fish. Obtains larger symmetrical dark bands or saddles, blotches on a broad, angular, high pectoral fins. It has a dark tail base, with white margins. Body: Has simple flat nasal barbels, with its tips tapering or spatulate. The anterior nasal flaps smooth or are slightly fringed. There are no angular lobes on lateral dermal flaps. Enlarged thorns on its head, and not back. Obtains a concave between its eyes.

Distribution and range
Western Indian Ocean: found in east and southern Africa; South Africa to Mozambique, Tanzania and Madagascar, and possibly Somalia. Nominal west African records possibly based on another species. 4°S - 32°S.

Climate and habitat
Subtropical; continental shelf and upper slope, demersal, marine. Usually found in sand and mud. From surfing too? - 494 m, but usually occurs at 60–300 m down.

Behavior
Lies in wait buried underneath sand or mud to ambush its prey with lightning-fast reflexes and great precision.

Biology
Diet: Feeds on small bony fishes, squid and octopuses, and including shrimp. Reproduction: Is ovoviviparous and gives birth to at least 7 or 11 pups per litter.

Status
IUCN Red List: near threatened. It is common only on the east coast of South Africa. Trawl fishery bycatch.

Threat to humans
Traumatogenic.

Resilience and vulnerability
Very low, minimum population doubling time more than 14 years; high vulnerability.

References

 
 Compagno, Dando, & Fowler, Sharks of the World, Princeton University Press, New Jersey 2005 

African angelshark
Fish of Mozambique
Fish of South Africa
African angelshark